The 2012 Circuit of Ireland, officially the Donnelly Group Circuit of Ireland Rally was the third round of the 2012 Intercontinental Rally Challenge. The fifteen stage tarmac event took place between 6–7 April 2012 with two of the Friday stages taking place at night.

It was the first time the event had been included in the IRC calendar.

Introduction
The rally was based in Armagh with the fifteen stages rally covering a total of  primarily on closed public road. A super special stage started the event at the Titanic Quarter, Belfast on the Friday afternoon.

Results

Special stages

References

External links 
 The official website for the rally
 The official website of the Intercontinental Rally Challenge

Ireland
Circuit of Ireland
Circuit of Ireland
Rally Ireland